Csaba Haranghy (born 20 September 1963) is a Hungarian sailor. He competed in the Star event at the 1996 Summer Olympics.

References

External links
 

1963 births
Living people
Hungarian male sailors (sport)
Olympic sailors of Hungary
Sailors at the 1996 Summer Olympics – Star
Sportspeople from Budapest
20th-century Hungarian people